John Barry Mortimer, GBS, SPMB, OBE, QC (born 1931) is a British barrister who has held senior judicial appointments in Hong Kong and Brunei Darussalam.

Early life and education
Mortimer was born in the United Kingdom in 1931. He was educated at St Peter's School, York. He graduated from Emmanuel College, Cambridge with a BA in 1955.

Legal career
Mortimer was called to the Bar at the Middle Temple in England in 1956. He took silk in 1971. He was elected a Bencher of the Middle Temple in 1981.

Judicial career
In 1985, Mortimer was appointed a Judge of the High Court of Hong Kong.

From 1989 to 1995, Mortimer was a member of the Law Reform Commission of Hong Kong.

In 1993, Mortimer was appointed a Justice of Appeal, and in 1997 became Vice President of the Court of Appeal of Hong Kong (a position in which he served until his retirement from the Court of Appeal in 1999). Between 1997 and 2015, he was a Non-Permanent Judge of the Hong Kong Court of Final Appeal.

In 2002, Mortimer was elected as a Senior Bencher of the Middle Temple.

In 2005, Mortimer was appointed as a Judicial Commissioner of the Supreme Court of Brunei Darussalam. Between 2010 and 2018, Mortimer served as President of the Court of Appeal of Brunei Darussalam.

Honours

In 1999, Mortimer was awarded the Golden Bauhinia Star by the Chief Executive of Hong Kong.

On retirement from the bench in 2018, Mortimer was awarded the Order of Seri Paduka Mahkota Brunei (First Class) by the Sultan of Brunei.

In the 2019 New Year Honours, Mortimer was appointed OBE for services to law by Her Majesty Queen Elizabeth II.

References

People educated at St Peter's School, York
Alumni of Emmanuel College, Cambridge
Hong Kong judges
British Hong Kong judges
Living people
Recipients of the Gold Bauhinia Star
Officers of the Order of the British Empire
English barristers
1931 births
English King's Counsel
20th-century King's Counsel
21st-century King's Counsel
Members of the Middle Temple